Eulima fischeri is a species of sea snail, a marine gastropod mollusk in the family Eulimidae. The species is one of a number within the genus Eulima.

This is a taxon inquirendum.

Description
The length of the shell attains 3.5 mm.

Distribution
This marine species occurs in the Gulf of Guinea.

References

External links
 Dautzenberg P. (1912) Mission Gruvel sur la côte occidentale d'Afrique (1909-1910): Mollusques marins. Annales de l'Institut Océanographique, Paris, (Nouvelle Série) 5(3): 1-111, pl. 1-3

fischeri
Gastropods described in 1912